Zeboim can refer to a number of things:

 Zeboim (Hebrew Bible), a location mentioned in the Hebrew Bible
 Zeboim, a location in the game Xenogears
 Zeboim, a divinity in the fictional Dragonlance universe